The Battle of Brașov was fought on July 17, 1603, between the troops of Wallachia led by Radu Șerban and the Habsburg monarchy on one side and the Transylvanian troops led by Mózes Székely on the other side.

Mózes Székely was killed on the battlefield, and the Wallachian lord Radu Șerban became ruler of Transylvania until September 1603, when Giorgio Basta and the imperial commissioners took control of the country in the name of the emperor.

Context 
The decade previous to the battle was a tumultuous one for Transylvania, during which the Habsburg Empire seemed to be losing its grasp on the province. Prince Sigismund Báthory was nominally elected to be its leader in 1581, at the age of nine, and between 1593 and 1601 he had abdicated the throne three times in favour of other members of the family in order to please the imperial interests.

After brief spells during which Transylvania was controlled by Wallachian prince Michael the Brave and subsequently by mercenaries of Habsburg general Giorgio Basta, military leader Moses Székely instigated the native Transylvanian forces to rebel and, with the support of Turkish-Tartarian auxiliary forces proclaimed himself Prince of Transylvania on 8 May 1603.

Székely's attempt to replace the Habsburg presence in Transylvania with a government that was friendly to the Ottoman Empire was unacceptable to Radu Șerban, who ”could not allow Wallachia to be caught in a vice between the Ottoman Empire south of the Danube and a Transylvania that swore fealty to it”. Much of the Transylvanian nobility sided with Șerban, against the excesses of the Ottoman-backed usurper, with Brașov itself remaining loyal to the Habsburg.

The battle 
In July 1603 several smaller Wallachian-Habsburg forces crossed the Carpathians and engaged in skirmishes with Székely's troops around Feldioara, resulting in an early strategic victory. Unsure of his chances in open battle against the bulk of the Wallachian army, Székely adopted a defensive posture, entrenching his army (consisting of 4000 Hungarians, 2000 Tatars, and 25 light cannons) near Râșnov in an improvised camp surrounded by linked carts. On the 15th of July Radu Șerban crossed the mountains and joined the rest of the forces. In total, the Wallachian-Habsburg army consisted of 10,000 men: two flanks of 2000 soldiers each and a main army of 6000 men led by Șerban himself.

The main battle took place on 17 July, when the Wallachian troops attacked the defending camp. Following prolonged close combat, the defenders started suffering heavy losses and broke ranks, attempting to flee. Șerban gave the order to follow and cut down those who were trying to escape This included Mózes Székely who, refusing to surrender, attempted to flee to Brașov to save his life, but was caught by the Wallachian cavalry and executed.

Aftermath 
Radu Șerban became ruler of Transylvania until September 1603. Despite initial fears from Giorgio Basta that Șerban would try to clam Transylvania for himself after the battle, mirroring Michael the Brave, Basta and the imperial commissioners took control of the country in the name of the emperor.

Depictions 
The Battle of Brașov is the most recent battle included in the Allegory of the Turkish War, a volume of oil sketches on parchment created by German painter Hans von Aachen around 1607, while he was acting as the court painter of Emperor Rudolf II.

References

1603 in Europe
Battles involving Wallachia
Battles involving Transylvania
Military history of Romania
Conflicts in 1603
Principality of Transylvania (1570–1711)
Battles of the Long Turkish War
History of Brașov